Yunohamella lyrica is a species of cobweb spider in the family Theridiidae. It is found in North America, Korea, and Japan.

References

External links

 

Theridiidae
Articles created by Qbugbot
Spiders described in 1841
Spiders of Asia
Spiders of North America